Peepal Khoont mainly known as Pipalkhunt is a Tehsil headquarter and Panchayat Samiti of the Pratapgarh district of Rajasthan state. It is a sub-division among the 5 sub-divisions of the Pratapgarh district. The main market is called Sadar Bajar. It is situated on National Highway 113. Pipalkhunt is a town located on the Banswara - Jaipur Expressway surrounded by the hills, plants and trees. The town is situated on the bank of the Mahi River.

History

Pipalkhunt had been a sub tehsil of Ghatol tehsil of Banswara district before it was declared as a sub division of Pratapgarh, when the district came into existence. Pratapgarh district is the 33rd district of Rajasthan, created on 26 January 2008. It is a part of Udaipur Division.

Population
Inhabited by about 80% of tribal population of Meena community, Pipalkhunt has 31 Gram Panchayats, 3 Inspector revenue circles, 20 patwar circles and 207 inhabited villages.

As per 2011 census, the population of this sub division was around 5890 out of which the male population was around 2980 and females were around 2914. Scheduled caste population was around 3,424 and scheduled tribe population was around 66,355.

Literacy and education

It has 52.44% male literacy, and 22.74% female literacy as per 2001 census.

Educational Institutions in Peepal Khoont include:
 Government Sr. Sec. School
 Government Primary School
 Government Secondary Girls School
 Mewar College of Graduation (Affiliated to Mohanlal Sukhadia University, Udaipur)
 Vaagad Shikshan Sansthan
 Saraswati Educational Society
 Bhardwaj Public School

Geography

Part of this tehsil has dense forest wealth.
Bori, Chhari, Dungawali, Jetaliya, Kelamata, Nayan, Kesharpura, Ghantali and Tamatiya are relatively bigger villages.

The town has a Govt. Hospital, Homeopathy Hospital, Panchayat Samiti, Police station, Tehsil Headquarter, Magistrate Office, Lower Justice Court and Many Administrative hubs for nearby villages.

Pipalkhunt is the center of many political affairs as the previous and current MLAs (Member of Vidhan Sabha) are from the nearby locations of Pipalkhunt.

Main attractions
 Amba Mata Mandir,
 Pawti Hanuman Mandir
 Mahi Mata Mandir
 Sheetla Mata Mandir
 Digamber Jain Mandir (Aranath Bhagwan)
 Mahi River
 Shiv Mandir
 Digamber Jain Mandir (Aadinath Bhagwan)
 Shri 1008 Godi Parasnath Shwetamber Jain Mandir
 Kali Kalyan Dham Kallaji Rathore
 Gautameshwar Mahadev
 Mahi Bajaj Sagar Dam
 Rama Peer Ki Dargah
 Jakham Dam
 Mail Talab
 Kela Mela
 Digamber Jain Mandir (Shantinath Bhagwan)
 Sita Mata Wildlife Sanctuary - It houses ancient Valmiki Ashram (the birthplace of Luv and Kush, the twins born to Sita and Lord Rama), the Hanuman and Sitamata temples, and other places of historical and mythological importance. Another place of interest in the sanctuary,  from Tikhi Magri, is Lakhiya Bhata, where drawings of prehistoric animals are engraved on rocks. There is a fair held in the sanctuary at the Sita Mata temple every July.

Jainism

The Jain community in Pipalkhunt is one of the main religions of the main town. Many people of Pipalkhunt from Jain community are living in Kuwait and other places of India. The Jain people celebrate many festivals like Mahavir Jayanti, Paryushana, Samvatsari, etc. One Jain Temple of Shri Aranatha Bhagwan is also there which was built a few years ago. Many Digambar and Shwetambar Jain Monks (Saadhu Shri and Saadhvi Shri) keep visiting here and shadow this place with their blessings. Most of the Jain persons are Shopkeepers and having their shops in the main market. Out of the two sub-sects of Jains, mostly Digambars resides here. There are only a few families of Shwetambar sect.

Transport Connectivity

By Air
Nearest Airport is Maharana Pratap Airport or Udaipur Airport which is the domestic airport at Udaipur, Rajasthan, India. It has a temporary helipad in operation.

By Train
The nearest Railway stations to the Peepal Khoont are Mandsaur (69 km), Nimbahera (115 km), Dungarpur (119 km), Ratlam (100 km) and Udaipur (165 km).

Pratapgarh is the only district without rail-connectivity in Rajasthan state. However, as a result of untiring efforts by ex-district collector Hemant Shesh, the Government of Rajasthan agreed to pursue vigorously with Ministry of Railways, Government of India to connect Pratapgarh with broad-gauge from Mandsaur (32 km), for which appropriate financial contribution to GOI may also be made by the state, if required. It is therefore, presumed that a new railway track ultimately shall be laid from Mandsaur to Pratapgarh, as publicly assured and announced by Shri Ashok Gahlot, the chief minister of Rajasthan on 18 May 2011 at Pratapgarh. Shri Dinesh Trivedi, Minister of Railways, introducing the Railway Budget 2012–2013 on 14 March 2012 has declared to undertake a survey of laying railway track between Mandsaur and Pratapgarh. This new line includes in the GOI list of 111 New Line Surveys to be taken up during 2012–13.

The Railway Ministry has approved railway line to be established to connect the Dungarpur and Ratlam station. Recently railway line work in progress and final location for rail track marked by agency.

By Road
Peepal Khoont is well connected with major cities in Rajasthan, Gujarat & Madhya Pradesh by road. Daily bus services connects Pipalkhunt with Delhi (714 km), Jaipur (458 km), Bhilwara (207 km), Mumbai (683 km), Chittorgarh (148 km), Ajmer (345 km), Alwar (604 km), Jodhpur (422 km), Bikaner (596 km), Pilani (661 km), Hanumangarh (774 km), Shriganganagar (840 km), Pali, Jalore (360 km), Jhalawar (291 km), Kota, Ahmedabad (295 km), Vadodara (274 km), Surat (420 km), Bhavnagar (467 km), Vapi (524 km), Ratlam (127 km), Neemuch (108 km), Dungarpur (119 km), Rajsamand (275 km), Bhopal (445 km), Indore (271 km), Mandsaur (69 km), Dahod (149 km), Godhra (197 km) and many other cities in Rajasthan. Private bus operators are also providing regular connectivity to Peepal Khoont from nearby places.

Public Representatives

Lok Sabha

Chittorgarh-Pratapgarh Lok Sabha constituency is one of the 25 Lok Sabha (parliamentary) constituencies in Rajasthan state in India.

Sh. Chandra Prakash Joshi is the newly elected member of Lok Sabha from Chittorgarh (Lok Sabha constituency) in the 2014 elections.

Vidha Sabha

In 2013 assembly elections in Rajasthan, Sh. Navneetlal Ninama of BJP won the Ghatol (St) assembly constituency.

References

External links
www.pratapgarhrajasthan.nic.in

Cities and towns in Pratapgarh district, Rajasthan